Kim Jin-woo (born September 26, 1991), also known mononymously as Jinu, is a South Korean singer, actor and member of Winner under YG Entertainment. The band debuted on August 17, 2014, with the full-length album entitled 2014 S/S. Kim also debuted as a soloist on August 14, 2019, with the single album titled Jinu's Heyday.

Life and career

1991–2012: Early life 
Kim Jin-woo was born on September 26, 1991, in Imja Island, Sinan County, South Jeolla, South Korea, and resided in Mokpo since the age of seven (Korean age) with his family of which he is a middle child of amid two sisters. Kim was raised by his grandmother for most of his childhood and adolescence and whom he felt most attached to amongst members of his family. His father was often found absent within the household due to his line of business in fisheries as the captain of a fishing boat and its cycle of sailing for three or six month intervals before his return. He and his younger sister of eight years, were also distant by his truancy from each others lives. 

In the midst of his senior year of high school his curiosity and admiration for the late veteran actress Choi Jin-sil stemmed an interest for acting which led the 19-year-old (Korean age) to join an acting institute in Mokpo. Kim soon enrolled for its vocal and dance lessons and learned all of its branches were owned by Seungri of Big Bang – notable attendees include BTS' J-Hope and Mijoo of Lovelyz. Kim was scouted by the celebrity and travelled to Seoul to attend a private audition for YG Entertainment with his referral and waited six months before his recruitment into its trainee program in August 2010. Ahead of his acceptance, he had previously auditioned for a large-scale company besides YG Entertainment but did not pass and also declined an offer to join a different agency through casting.

2013–present: Debut with Winner and solo debut 

In his training period, Kim served as a backup dancer for the 2011 YG Family Concert and was urged by CEO Yang Hyun-suk to receive rap lessons for three months to boost his confidence. Kim participated as a contestant for WIN: Who is Next? (2013) which involved two assembles consisting of male trainees under YG Entertainment (A and B) who would battle for the chance to debut by series end after embarking on a one-hundred day journey. He was placed as the eldest and longest trained member of "Team A" with Lee Seung-hoon, Song Min-ho, Kang Seung-yoon and Nam Tae-hyun. In the last episode, Team A had won the show and would debut under the name "Winner". Kim ended his four year training period with his official debut with the five-piece band on August 17, 2014, and the studio album entitled 2014 S/S. The band's success upon debut was recorded as "unprecedented" by Korean media outlets and were dubbed as "monster rookies".

Kim made his acting debut through the web drama Magic Cellphone (2016) followed Love For A Thousand More (2016) with band-mate Kang Seung-yoon. The latter series exceeded 5 million views as of December 2016 and was cited a success.

In November 2016, Kim joined as the lead role for the production The Little Prince by the Korea National Contemporary Dance Company. Artistic director and choreographer Ahn Ae-soon stated he was cast as his image befitted the role of his character and noticed his passion for dance. Kim cited the experience "healed" him and changed the way he thought about dancing. He credits it helped his career in music and learned modern dance was about dancing to your natural rhythm and dancing to the beat of your own drum is always right. Kim became the first K-pop idol to take part of a contemporary dance production.

Kim and his first role as part of a regular cast for Wizard of Nowhere (2017–2018) earned him a nomination for the "Rookie Award" at the 2017 MBC Entertainment Awards. His credits in entertainment further included Live a Good Life (2018) with label-mates Kwon Hyun-bin and Yoo Byung-jae, Legendary Big Fish (2019) and Scene's Quiz (2019).

Kim debuted as a soloist on August 14 with the single album Jinu's Heyday (2019) after five years into his career within the music industry ahead of his mandatory military service. Its lead single "Call Anytime" (또또또; ttottotto) was featured and co-written by his band-mate Mino. His first music show broadcast was aired on Show! Music Core on August 17 which also marked his band's debut anniversary.

Following his military discharge and Winner's first comeback after their two years hiatus, on August 5th, 2022, it was reported that Kim would return as an actor in a drama titled Delivery Man. He will star as a character named Lee Dong-wook, a man with idol-like visuals and an unexpected personality, alongside actors Yoon Chan-young and Bang Min-ah.

Personal life 
As part of his mandatory military service, Kim enlisted as a public service worker on April 2, 2020, and served his training at the Nonsan Army Training Center for four weeks prior to fulfilling his military duty as a public service worker. Kim was discharged from military service on December 31, 2021.

Public image 
Kim is well known in South Korea for his visuals, in which he was placed second for male idol with perfect facial ratios.

Other ventures

Philanthropy 
In 2018, Kim Jinwoo participated in Ice Bucket Challenge to raise money and awareness for ALS patients.

On April 6, 2019 it was reported by an official that Kim quietly made a donation of 10 million Won to the Hope Bridge Association of the National Disaster Relief for the victims of the Gangwon Province wildfire in South Korea. On September 18, Kim reportedly donated 10 million Won in support to help the victims who have suffered from the natural disaster, Typhoon Lingling.

During promotion of his solo debut, Kim collaborated with Naver Happy Bean Campaign which aims to raise fund and support to build a shelter/center for abandoned and neglected animals. 

On March 1, 2020, Kim gave a donation of 10 million Won to the Hope Bridge Association to help those affected by the coronavirus pandemic. On August 13, 2020, it was reported that Kim has donated 10 million Won to the Hope Bridge National Disaster Relief Association for the flood victims who were affected by the heavy rain in Korea, showing his unstoppable good deeds despite currently serving in the military. 

On August 10, 2022, Kim donated  to help those affected by the 2022 South Korean floods through the Hope Bridge Korea Disaster Relief Association.

On February 8, 2023, Kim donated 10 million won to help 2023 Turkey–Syria earthquake, by donating money through Hope Bridge National Disaster Relief Association.

Discography

Single albums

As a lead artist

Videography

Music video

Filmography

Television series

Web series

Television shows

Web show

Stage production

Awards and nominations

External links

References

1991 births
Living people
People from South Jeolla Province
K-pop singers
South Korean male singers
South Korean pop singers
South Korean male television actors
South Korean male idols
South Korean male web series actors
Winner (band) members